Standings and results for Group G of the Top 16 phase of the 2003-04 Euroleague basketball tournament.

Standings

Fixtures and results
Game 1, March 4, 2004

Game 2,  March 10–11, 2004

Game 3, March 18, 2004

Game 4, March 25, 2004

Game 5, April 1, 2004

Game 6, April 8, 2004

External links
Group G results from the Official Euroleague site

Top 16 Group G